Sainik School at Korukonda informally began on 10 September 1961. The school was formally founded by its first principal, Commander Trevor De Almeida, on 18 January 1962, when the first batch of 205 students had joined.

Overview 

The building which is now Sainik School was originally named Alak Appala Kondayamba Vijayaram Palace. As a tribute to the Royal Family, the original crest and motto of the Gajapathi dynasty was adopted by the school from its inception.

The Palace was a center for games and sports, where all-India tournaments were conducted, and sportsmen from all over India came to participate and enjoy the princely reception till about 1933.

The school now sends around 600 students into the National Defence Academy. The instructional block is a two-storied building with classrooms, laboratories, an art and craft gallery and academic departments. The administrative wing of the school is housed in the Palace.

Admissions 

Boys are admitted to classes VI and IX  and is by examination. There are numerous merit cum means based scholarships sponsored both by the state government and Ministry of Defence, Government of India, made available to prospective students.

Academics 

The school has 32 teachers. Some of the academic staff are recipients of the President of India's medal for best teachers.

All students are offered the Science stream,  with the option of choosing between Biology and Computer Sciences after AISSE board exams. The school follows CBSE curriculum and medium of instruction (and day to day conversation) is English. The school also prepares boys for the UPSC examination for entry into NDA, and gives guidance for other competitive exams like the National Talent Search Examination (NTSE), Maths and science Olympiad and G.K. contest.

On the basis of the grades obtained by students in Class X and XII the school is ranked as one of the best in the country.

There are laboratories for  Physics, Chemistry,  and biology. The campus is covered by broadband connectivity. The school has a reading room and library. Books can be issued to boys in the afternoons and in holidays. All leading regional and national  newspaper s and magazines are available.

Extra-curricular activities 

The school sends many cadets to R.D.C. Membership into one of the hobby clubs is compulsory. They include painting, woodwork, photography, philately, music, dance, band, aero-modelling, ship-modelling, and radio ham. The school has programmes like social forestry, adult education and ‘Janmabhoomi’ (Village uplift programme). Students often represent the school and the district in state and national level competitions.

Literary activities include debates, declamation, dramatics recitation, and quizzes.

NCC Training is compulsory for all the students who are admitted to the school. The school imparts training to all three wings of NCC namely Army, Navy and Air Force, In Army wing the school has Senior Division NCC. The students are given an opportunity to appear for ‘B’ Certificate examination (an examination which is usually reserved for NCC cadets at undergraduate level or higher) in THE ARMY wing.

The school sponsors activities like trekking, mountaineering, cycling, rock climbing, parasailing, scuba diving and other adventure activities. Cadets are trained to attend all India NCC Camps which includes the Republic Day and Independence day Camp at New Delhi. Students have also been selected by the Government of India to represent the nation at Youth Exchange Programmes between countries.

Competitions are held in dramatics and entertainment. Some of the theater dramas with a strong social message have been performed at district and state-level festivals. The school has a  music and dance (classical and folk) clubs which perform for major occasions.

The school is a regional chapter of the Society for Promotion of Indian Classical Music and Culture amongst Youth (SPIC-MACAY) and has hosted classical artists of international repute, where students are given lessons by the best in the field

Sports 

Emphasis is given to sport in the school and participation by all boys in at least one game is compulsory. The school has specialist coaches for games and sports like football, basketball, volleyball,  badminton, lawn tennis, skating, boxing, and gymnastics, besides indoor games like squash, table tennis, chess, and carroms.

The school has a swimming pool of 25 x 15 metres; and facilities for playing billiards, badminton, lawn tennis, squash and table tennis and an air rifle shooting range.

Members of the school shooting club represent the Sainik School Society and the state of Andhra Pradesh in the national shooting championship. The cadets are given training in yoga and martial arts, especially karate and taekwondo. The school has won the South Zone Sainik School Sports Championship for a seventh time in a row.

Athletic championships and cross-country races form major part of school calendar. Athletic championships are run over a period of 3–5 days in December. The opening ceremony involves an opening march-past of athletes of all eight houses, lighting of an Olympic flame by the school sports captain and the taking of an Olympic oath by all participating athletes.

Athletes compete in almost all Olympic athletic events and competition among houses can be extremely intense. The closing ceremony of the athletic championships usually coincide with the annual day celebrations of the school and involves a closing march-past, in addition to fire-acrobat and gymnastics display.

Cross country races are held at least three times in any one academic year. The junior houses (class VI to VII) run the 5 km version while the senior houses (class IX to XII) run the 9 km version.

The school continues to excel in the inter zonal championships too.

Alumni organisation 

The organisation is named "Association Saikorian" and has Chapters in Hyderabad, Visakhapatnam and Vijayawada and one international chapter in the USA. Association Saikorian is involved in charity work especially in helping children of the underprivileged get access to an education. It organizes all its activities under the umbrella name of "Project Krushi".

Notable alumni

 Lt Gen K Surendra Nath , general officer commanding in chief, ARTRAC (Army Training Command), Shimla; Indian Army
 Col B. Santosh Babu,MVC, Commanding officer of 16 Bihar Regiment.
 Duvvuri Subbarao, former governor, Reserve Bank of India
 Commodore C. Uday Bhaskar, Indian Navy, Defence Analyst
 K. Vijaya Bhaskar - Telugu film director
 Cherukuri Rajkumar alias Azad, Spokesperson, Communist Party of India (Maoist)
 Malli Mastan Babu, mountaineer and world's fastest seven summiteer.  
 Vice Admiral Murlidhar Sadashiv Pawar, present Deputy chief of naval staff.

References

External links

 Official website of Sainik School, Korukonda
 Official website of Association Saikorian, Aulmni Association of Sainik School Korukonda

Sainik schools
Schools in Vizianagaram district
Educational institutions established in 1962
1962 establishments in Andhra Pradesh